Flight 109 may refer to:

Aeroflot Flight 109, crashed on 18 May 1973
Sudan Airways Flight 109, crashed on 10 June 2008

0109